Ararat Wind Farm is a wind farm in western Victoria, Australia. It is located approximately 180km northwest of Melbourne. It was officially opened on 27 June 2017 and was the third-largest wind farm in Australia at that time, with capacity to generate 240MW from 75 turbines.

The farm has General Electric turbines that have a rated capacity of 3.2 MW, a hub height of 85 metres, 103 metre rotor diameter, and a tip height of 135 metres.

Of the 75 turbines, 70 are in the Rural City of Ararat and five are in the Shire of Northern Grampians.

Operations 
The wind farm began grid output in August 2016 and reached full output in June 2017 and has operated continuously since then. The generation table uses eljmkt nemlog to obtain generation values for each month.

Note: Asterisk indicates power output was limited during the month.

References

Wind farms in Victoria (Australia)